Leland Justin Webb (August 5, 1846 – February 21, 1893) was an American lawyer and politician.  His father was Colonel William C. Webb, a district attorney, judge and state assemblyman.

Born in Smithfield, Bradford County, Pennsylvania, he moved with his parents to Wautoma, Wisconsin in 1853.

During the American Civil War, at the age of 15, he enlisted as a drummer in Company H, 16th Wisconsin Infantry, on October 15, 1861, and was discharged on August 25, 1862. Returning to Wisconsin, he re-enlisted in Company I, 30th Wisconsin Infantry as a musician and was discharged on March 8, 1865. He served in several major engagements including Shiloh, Nashville and Corinth.

In 1868, Webb moved to Fort Scott, Kansas where he joined the 19th Kansas Cavalry Regiment for service against hostile Indians. Webb was admitted to the Kansas bar in 1869. He, then, moved to Columbus, Kansas and served as the city's first mayor. In 1871, Webb moved to Winfield, Kansas. In 1877 and 1878, Webb served in the Kansas House of Representatives and was involved with the Republican Party.

Webb as a member of the Grand Army of the Republic and served as Commander-in-Chief of the Sons of Veterans from 1890 to 1891.  He was a hereditary companion of the Military Order of the Loyal Legion of the United States by right of his father's service as a colonel in the Union Army during the Civil War.

In 1880, Webb moved to Topeka, Kansas and continued to practice law.  He died in Topeka on February 21, 1893.

Notes

External links

1846 births
1893 deaths
People from Bradford County, Pennsylvania
People from Wautoma, Wisconsin
People from Topeka, Kansas
People of Illinois in the American Civil War
People of Wisconsin in the American Civil War
Kansas lawyers
Mayors of places in Kansas
Republican Party members of the Kansas House of Representatives
People from Fort Scott, Kansas
19th-century American politicians
19th-century American lawyers